Muhammad Faiz may refer to:
 Faiz Muhammad, Pakistani freestyle wrestler
 Muhammad Faiz (footballer), Indonesian footballer